Dominican Republic competed at the 2022 World Aquatics Championships in Budapest, Hungary from 17 June to 3 July.

Diving

Dominican Republic entered two divers.

Men

Swimming

Dominican Republic has entered two swimmers.

Men

Women

References

Nations at the 2022 World Aquatics Championships
Dominican Republic at the World Aquatics Championships
2022 in Dominican Republic sport